Talk is a 1994 Australian film directed by Susan Lambert and starring Victoria Longley and Angie Milliken.

Production
The film was shot from 1 March to 2 April 1993.

Reception
The LA Times's Kevin Thomas said "Susan Lambert’s ingenious and affecting "Talk" is a little gem of a movie, a witty and effervescent bittersweet comedy, shot through with humor and pain, that swiftly captures your attention and then involves your emotions as it gradually acquires depth." Caryn James wrote in the New York Times "Still, Susan Lambert, the director, is innovative and daring when she needs to be, and in command of the ordinary details when that is called for, too. Angie Milliken as Stephanie and Victoria Longley as Julia capture the strengths and confusion of women in their 30's who mistakenly think they might want to trade lives." Writing for Variety David Stratton states "Susan Lambert’s first feature, after a number of interesting shorts and medium-length films, is a mixture of reality and fantasy that cogently explores the lives of two thirtysomething women friends during a period of less than 24 hours. The reality works much better than the fantasy, but the net result is positive, and this low-budgeter, which is already sparking fest interest, starting with Seattle, could have a modestly successful arthouse life."

Awards
1994 AFI Awards
Best Performance by an Actress in a Leading Role – Victoria Longley (nominated)

References

External links

Talk at Oz Movies
Talk at the National Film and Sound Archive

1994 films
Australian comedy-drama films
1994 comedy-drama films
1990s English-language films
1990s Australian films